Shane Patrick Mahan (born September 22, 1964) is an American special effects creator, creature designer, puppeteer and producer known for his work at Stan Winston Studio and its successor, Legacy Effects. His film credits include The Terminator and Terminator 2: Judgment Day; Aliens; Predator and Predator 2; The Lost World: Jurassic Park; Iron Man, Iron Man 2  and Iron Man 3; Pacific Rim and The Shape of Water. 

Personal.

Background
Mahan was born and raised in Greenville, Michigan. After graduating from Greenville High School in 1981 he left for Hollywood.  His first job was with Stan Winston Studios as a crew member working on The Terminator in 1983.  There he worked as a creature effects supervisor. After Stan winston's passing he formed Legacy effects with three partners who were also his former colleagues at Stan Winston studios and this has now become the Leading VFX company in Hollywood 

Mahan and his design team made the special suits worn by Robert Downey Jr. in the film Iron Man. They also designed the suit for Iron Man which was ten feet tall, weighed 800lbs and required 5 operators to puppeteer. Besides several other nominations, Mahan and his team were nominated for the 2008 Oscar for 'Best Achievement in Visual Effects' for Iron Man. The team was hired as concept artists by James Cameron for his film Avatar. This was special for Mahan as his first special effects credits were for the film The Terminator.

Mahan worked for Stan Winston Studios until the death of Stan Winston in 2008 when he and three other veterans of the company, Lindsay MacGowan, J. Alan Scott and John Rosengrant, incorporated Legacy Effects, a character design, make-up and animatronic studio, so named in honor of the late Winston's legacy and lifelong achievements. He lives in Los Angeles.

Partial filmography

Movie special effects

Other special effects

Puppeteer 
A Gnome Named Gnorm (1990) 
Predator 2 (1990)
Jurassic Park (1993)
T2 3-D: Battle Across Time (1996)
The Lost World: Jurassic Park (1997)
Inspector Gadget (1999)
What Lies Beneath (2000) 
Because of Winn-Dixie (2005)
Zathura: A Space Adventure (2005)
Eight Below (2006)

Make-up
Chiller (1985) (TV)
Batman Returns (1992)
The Island of Dr. Moreau (1996) 
Wrong Turn (2003)
Constantine (2005)
Smile (2005)
Zathura: A Space Adventure (2005)
 Fur (2006)

Awards & nominations

|-
| 1997
| The Island of Dr. Moreau
| Saturn Award for Best Make-Up
| 
|-
| 2002
| The Day the World Ended
| Make-Up Artists and Hair Stylists Guild Award for Best Special Makeup Effects
| 
|-
| 2002
| How to Make a Monster
| Make-Up Artists and Hair Stylists Guild Award for Best Special Makeup Effects
| 
|-
| 2002
| Mermaid Chronicles Part 1: She Creature
| Make-Up Artists and Hair Stylists Guild Award for Best Special Makeup Effects
| 
|-
| 2008
| Iron Man
| Satellite Award Best Visual Effect
| 
|-
| 2008
| Iron Man
| Academy Award for Best Achievement in Visual Effects
| 
|-
| 2009
| Iron Man
| BAFTA Award for Best Special Visual Effects
| 
|-
| 2009
| Iron Man
| Saturn Award for Best Special Effects
|

References

External links

1964 births
American costume designers
American make-up artists
Living people
People from Greenville, Michigan
Special effects people